Kgabang Sekhabi (born 2000), popularly known as Shalate Sekhabi, is a South African actress and model. She is best known for the roles in the television soap opera as, The River, and House of Zwide.

Personal life
Sekhabi was born in 2000 in Mafikeng in the North West Province of South Africa. Her father Aubrey Sekhabi is a playwright and director. In 2018, she matriculated from Crawford College, Pretoria. Then in 2019, she entered to the University of the Witwatersrand, and later graduated with a Bachelor's degree in film and television.

Career
At the age of 8 years, she joined the school choir and drama club. Then, Sekhabi joined Steele Models when she was eleven years old. At the age of 14, she made film debut with two short films: A Cup of Sugar directed by Xolile Tshabalala and Making a Killing directed by Justine Head.

In January 2020, she made her television debut with the 1Magic soap opera The River, where she made the recurring role of "Millicent" in the season three of the soapie. After the success of the soapie, she was invited to play the lead role "Shoki" in the e.tv soap opera House of Zwide in the same year. Later in January 2021, the series replaced the long-running soap opera Rhythm City.

Filmography

References

Living people
South African film actresses
South African Tswana people
South African television actresses
2000 births